Trosia is a genus of moths in the family Megalopygidae described by Jacob Hübner in 1820.

Species
Trosia circumcincta (Schaus, 1905)
Trosia bicolor (Möschler, 1883)
Trosia dimas (Cramer, 1775)
Trosia fallax (Felder, 1874)
Trosia flavida Dognin, 1911
Trosia nigropuncta Druce, 1909
Trosia ochracea Hopp, 1922
Trosia pellucida (Möschler, 1877)
Trosia pulla Forbes, 1942
Trosia nigropunctigera D. S. Fletcher, 1982
Trosia nigrorufa (Walker, 1865)
Trosia roseipuncta (Druce, 1906)
Trosia rufa (E. D. Jones, 1912)
Trosia semirufa (Druce, 1906)
Trosia xinga (Dognin, 1922)
Trosia zernyi Hopp, 1930
Trosia zikani Hopp, 1922
Trosia acea Hopp, 1930

References

Megalopygidae
Megalopygidae genera
Taxa named by Jacob Hübner